Furia is a young adult fiction novel written by Yamile Saied Mendez. The main character, Camila, is a 17 year old living in modern-day Rosario, Santa Fe in Argentina. She aspires to be a great soccer star, but her home life and love life get in the way.

Furia received the Pura Belpré Award medal for Young Adult Narrative in 2021.

Plot
The book begins with Camila Hassan leaving her home to secretly play in a soccer match (referred to as fútbol).  Camila's secret becomes increasingly difficult to keep as her fame grows, her lover arrives back in town, and she struggles with injuries, sexism and family dynamics.

Characters
Camila Hassan (main character): is nicknamed La Furia, meaning "the fury."
Roxana: Camila's closest friend, plays fútbol on the same team of Camila.
Pablo Hassan: Camila's brother, is a skilled fútbol player in a national league.
Diego Ferrari: Camila's lover, is a major league fútbol player from the same barrio as Camila.
Camila's parents: referred to as Mami and Papa.  Their real names are Isabel and Andres. Camila has a close, albeit rocky, relationship with her mother and a bad relationship with her father.

Release 
Furia was published in hardback and ebook formats on September 15, 2020 through Algonquin Young Readers. An audiobook adaptation narrated by Sol Madariaga was released simultaneously through Workman Audio. A paperback edition was released through Algonquin Young Readers on February 15, 2022.

Themes 
Furia contains themes about coming of age and intersectional feminist outlooks, while also highlighting Argentinian culture.

Reception 
The Chicago Review of Books reviewed Furia, praising the character of Camila and the romance between her and Diego as "genuine and emotionally earned". Common Sense Media gave the work 5 out of 5 stars, highlighting it as having positive role models and messages.

Awards 
 Pura Belpré Award medal for Young Adult Narrative (2021, won)

References

External links 
 Review at the Daily Utah Chronicle

2020 novels
Novels set in Argentina
Young adult novels
English-language novels
Novels about association football
Santa Fe, Argentina
Algonquin Books books